Gesu Church is a Jesuit parish of the Roman Catholic Archdiocese of Milwaukee located in Milwaukee, Wisconsin. It is listed on the National Register of Historic Places and was designated a Milwaukee Landmark in 1975.

Although the church is not affiliated with Marquette University, through a 1991 partnership, it ministers to the downtown campus of Marquette and surrounding neighborhood.

Description 
Gesu, founded  in 1849 as St. Gall's Parish, initially served English-speaking Irish Catholics from the near south and west sides of Milwaukee in what was the neighborhood of Tory Hill. As the parish grew, it built Holy Name Church in 1875, and by 1887 Jesuit officials combined the two parishes into one church. The Gesu name was chosen in 1893 to honor the Church of the Gesu in Rome, where St. Ignatius of Loyola, founder of the Society of Jesus, is buried.

The cornerstone was laid on May 23, 1893, with over 20,000 in attendance. A dedication ceremony followed on December 17, 1894, to mark the formal completion of the church.

Actor Pat O'Brien (1899–1983) served as an altar boy at Gesu while growing up near 13th and Clybourn streets. He attended Marquette Academy (a preparatory department that later became Marquette University High School) with Spencer Tracy (1900–1967), and later attended Marquette University.

Gesu Church holds daily Masses and attracts over 2,500 worshipers on weekends.

In late 1954, the church held the funeral for Miller Brewing Company president Fred Miller and his son, Fred, Jr., attended by thousands.

Architecture and fittings
Architect Henry C. Koch designed the French Gothic building, drawing inspiration from the Cathedral of Chartres in France. It features landmark spires of unequal height, a centered rose window, and stained glass windows.

Gallery

See also
 List of Jesuit sites

References

External links

 Gesu Parish
 Historic Preservation Commission Study (PDF)
 Marquette University

Churches on the National Register of Historic Places in Wisconsin
Gothic Revival church buildings in Wisconsin
Roman Catholic churches completed in 1894
Jesuit churches in the United States
Marquette University
Roman Catholic churches in Milwaukee
National Register of Historic Places in Milwaukee
19th-century Roman Catholic church buildings in the United States